Glenea subviridescens is a species of beetle in the family Cerambycidae. It was described by Stephan von Breuning in 1963. It is known from Laos, Thailand, Vietnam and China.

References

subviridescens
Beetles described in 1963